In paternity testing, Paternity Index (PI) is a calculated value generated for a single genetic marker or locus (chromosomal location or site of DNA sequence of interest) and is associated with the statistical strength or weight of that locus in favor of or against parentage given the phenotypes of the tested participants and the inheritance scenario. Phenotype typically refers to physical characteristics such as body plan, color, behavior, etc. in organisms. However, the term used in the area of DNA paternity testing refers to what is observed directly in the laboratory. Laboratories involved in parentage testing and other fields of human identity employ genetic testing panels that contain a battery of loci (plural for locus) each of which is selected due to extensive allelic variations within and between populations.  These genetic variations  are not assumed to bestow physical and/or behavioral attributes to the person carrying the allelic arrangement(s) and therefore are not subject to selective pressure and follow Hardy Weinberg inheritance patterns.

The product of the individual PIs is  the CPI (Combined Paternity Index) which is ultimately used to calculate  the Probability of Paternity seen on paternity test reports. Minimum Probability of Paternity value requirements for state cases differ between states but the AABB requires in their Standards for Relationship Testing Laboratories (currently in the 9th edition) a minimum of 99.0% be reported where the tested man is ‘not excluded’ as the biological father of the child in question. U.S. Department of State requires a minimum Probability of Paternity of 99.5% for all immigration cases.

PI calculations utilize allele frequencies generated from established population databases most commonly using Short Tandem Repeats.

Because allele frequencies can be either generated in-house or published, PI’s can differ between companies. This is an understood phenomenon and justifiable amongst members of the testing community.

Calculations 

The PI is a likelihood ratio that is generated by comparing two probabilities where PI = X / Y:

 Numerator (“X”)  – The probability that we observe the phenotypes of the tested participants in the inheritance scenario given that the tested man is the true biological father. More simply, the probability that some event will occur given a certain set of circumstances or conditions. This calculation assumes that the individuals tested are a “true trio/duo” (which is explained two paragraphs down) or in other words, the parent(s) tested are the true biological parents.
 Denominator  (“Y”) – The probability that we observe the phenotypes of the tested participants in the inheritance scenario given that a random man is the true biological father. More simply, the probability that some event will occur given a different set of circumstances or conditions. This calculation assumes that the individuals tested are a “false trio/duo” or in other words, the parent(s) tested are not the true biological parents.

In general, X / Y can be translated as: It is X / Y times more likely to see the observed phenotypes if the tested man is the true biological father than if an untested, unrelated randomly selected man from the same racial population was the true biological father.

There are 14 possible trio paternity combinations and 5 possible duo paternity combinations.

See also
Combined DNA Index System
International Society for Forensic Genetics

References

Further reading

Brenner CH (1999) Kinship Analysis by DNA When There Are Many Possibilities, Progress in Forensic Genetics 8, Eds G Sensabaugh et al.

External links 
 aabb.org
 International Society of Forensic Genetics
 Howstuffworks.com - How DNA Testing Works
 STRBase
 US Department of State
 University of North Texas Health Sciences Center Graduate School of Biomedical Sciences Forensic and Investigative Genetics

DNA profiling techniques
Forensic genetics